Assent can refer to:
 , a village between Bekkevoort and Diest
 Assent (philosophy), the mental act of accepting a statement as true
 Offer and acceptance
 Royal assent
 Assent (military), Austrian mil. accept (s.o.) for military service()
 The Assent, a 2020 American horror film by Pearry Reginald Teo